Turrentine is a surname. Notable people with the surname include:

Howard Boyd Turrentine (1914–2010), United States federal judge
Stanley Turrentine (1934–2000), American jazz tenor saxophonist
Tommy Turrentine (1928–1997), swing and hard bop trumpeter, brother of Stanley Turrentine

See also
Turrentine Middle School one of six middle schools in the Alamance-Burlington School System